Errol Fraser Brain (born 21 July 1968) is a former New Zealand rugby union player and a current coach. He played as back-row/number 8.

Brain had more than 100 caps for Counties Manukau. He played for Auckland Blues (1996) and Waikato Chiefs (1997/98), in New Zealand, and Valence d'Agen (1993), in France. He moved to Toyota Motor Company, in Japan, where he played from 1999 to 2002.

Brain played for New Zealand Māori, from 1989 to 1998, and was also their captain.

In September 2010, he took charge as coach of Portugal, with a contract for three years. He started well, performing strongly, but his results later disappointed. He left in late March 2013 when his contract expired, with a mixed legacy of results. After returning to New Zealand, Brain was travelling back and forth on and off to Japan, where he coached. However, his family's final decision was to not move to Japan but to buy a business and settle down in Tauranga. Errol and his wife Tracy bought TDDA (the drug detection agency) and soon started buying businesses around the bay.

References

External links
Errol Brain International Data
Errol Brain Takes Charge of Portugal National Team (Portuguese)

1968 births
Living people
New Zealand rugby union players
New Zealand rugby union coaches
Māori All Blacks players
Blues (Super Rugby) players
Chiefs (rugby union) players
Counties Manukau rugby union players
New Zealand expatriate rugby union players
New Zealand expatriate sportspeople in Japan
New Zealand expatriate sportspeople in France
Expatriate rugby union players in France
Expatriate rugby union players in Japan